Egon Schübeler (4 September 1927 – 20 January 2022) was a German politician. A member of the Christian Democratic Union of Germany, he served in the Landtag of Schleswig-Holstein from 1967 to 1987. He died on 20 January 2022, at the age of 94.

References

1927 births
2022 deaths
20th-century German politicians
Christian Democratic Union of Germany politicians
Members of the Landtag of Schleswig-Holstein
People from Flensburg